South Africa took part in the 1976 Summer Paralympics in Toronto, Ontario, Canada. The country was represented by 39 athletes, twenty-nine male and ten female. South Africans competed in archery, athletics, dartchery, lawn bowls, swimming, table tennis and wheelchair basketball. They won twenty six medals in total: six golds, nine silvers and eleven bronze, finishing 19th on the medal table.

These were South Africa's last Paralympics for sixteen years due to South Africa's policy of apartheid. The Netherlands, as hosts of the 1980 Games and ironically its former colonial master, declared South Africa's further participation "undesirable". South Africa was subsequently absent from the Paralympic Games until 1992.

References 

Nations at the 1976 Summer Paralympics
1976
Summer Paralympics